The 2001–02 Atlanta Thrashers season was the Thrashers' third season of competition. For the second time in three seasons, the team finished the season with the worst record in the whole NHL, and failed to qualify for the playoffs for the third consecutive season.

Off-season
With Steve Staios departing to the Edmonton Oilers via free agency, Ray Ferraro was named the team’s new captain.

Regular season
The Thrashers struggled defensively, finishing 30th overall in goaltending, with 288 goals allowed, and on the power play, with only 37 power-play goals scored. They also allowed the most-short-handed goals of all 30 teams, with 12.

Final standings

Schedule and results

|- align="center" bgcolor="#CCFFCC" 
|1||W||October, 4, 2001||2–1||align="left"| @ Buffalo Sabres (2001-02) ||1–0–0–0 || 
|- align="center" bgcolor="#FF6F6F" 
|2||OTL||October, 6, 2001||3–4 OT||align="left"| @ Boston Bruins (2001-02) ||1–0–0–1 || 
|- align="center" bgcolor="#FFBBBB"
|3||L||October 13, 2001||5–2 || align="left"|  Carolina Hurricanes (2001-02) ||1–1–0–1 || 
|- align="center"
|4||T||October 16, 2001||3–3 || align="left"|  Philadelphia Flyers (2001-02) ||1–1–1–1 || 
|- align="center" bgcolor="#FFBBBB"
|5||L||October 19, 2001||3–4 || align="left"|  New York Rangers (2001–02) ||1–2–1–1 || 
|- align="center" bgcolor="#FF6F6F"
|6||OTL||October 20, 2001||1–2 OT|| align="left"| @ Carolina Hurricanes (2001–02) ||1–2–1–2 || 
|- align="center" bgcolor="#FFBBBB"
|7||L||October 23, 2001||2–4 || align="left"|  Pittsburgh Penguins (2001–02) ||1–3–1–2 || 
|- align="center" bgcolor="#CCFFCC" 
|8||W||October 26, 2001||1–0 || align="left"|  Washington Capitals (2001–02) ||2–3–1–2 || 
|- align="center" bgcolor="#CCFFCC" 
|9||W||October 27, 2001||4–3 || align="left"|  Tampa Bay Lightning (2001–02) ||3–3–1–2 || 
|- align="center" bgcolor="#FFBBBB"
|10||L||October 30, 2001||3–6 || align="left"|  Ottawa Senators (2001–02) ||3–4–1–2 || 
|-

|- align="center" bgcolor="#FFBBBB"
|11||L||November 1, 2001||2–5 || align="left"| @ San Jose Sharks (2001–02) ||3–5–1–2 || 
|- align="center" bgcolor="#FFBBBB"
|12||L||November 3, 2001||1–4 || align="left"| @ Los Angeles Kings (2001–02) ||3–6–1–2 || 
|- align="center" bgcolor="#FFBBBB"
|13||L||November 4, 2001||0–5 || align="left"| @ Mighty Ducks of Anaheim (2001–02) ||3–7–1–2 || 
|- align="center" bgcolor="#FFBBBB"
|14||L||November 7, 2001||2–3 || align="left"| @ New Jersey Devils (2001–02) ||3–8–1–2 || 
|- align="center" bgcolor="#FFBBBB"
|15||L||November 8, 2001||0–8 || align="left"| @ Buffalo Sabres (2001–02) ||3–9–1–2 || 
|- align="center" bgcolor="#FFBBBB"
|16||L||November 10, 2001||0–3 || align="left"| @ Washington Capitals (2001–02) ||3–10–1–2 || 
|- align="center" bgcolor="#FFBBBB"
|17||L||November 13, 2001||2–4 || align="left"| @ Minnesota Wild (2001–02) ||3–11–1–2 || 
|- align="center" 
|18||T||November 16, 2001||4–4 OT|| align="left"|  Nashville Predators (2001–02) ||3–11–2–2 || 
|- align="center" bgcolor="#FFBBBB"
|19||L||November 18, 2001||2–6 || align="left"| @ New York Rangers (2001–02) ||3–12–2–2 || 
|- align="center" bgcolor="#CCFFCC" 
|20||W||November 19, 2001||3–2 || align="left"|  Buffalo Sabres (2001–02) ||4–12–2–2 || 
|- align="center" bgcolor="#FFBBBB"
|21||L||November 22, 2001||2–5 || align="left"|  Montreal Canadiens (2001–02) ||4–13–2–2 || 
|- align="center" bgcolor="#CCFFCC" 
|22||W||November 24, 2001||6–3 || align="left"| @ Ottawa Senators (2001–02) ||5–13–2–2 || 
|- align="center" bgcolor="#FFBBBB"
|23||L||November 27, 2001||1–5 || align="left"| @ Montreal Canadiens (2001–02) ||5–14–2–2 || 
|- align="center" bgcolor="#FFBBBB"
|24||L||November 29, 2001||2–5 || align="left"| @ Tampa Bay Lightning (2001–02) ||5–15–2–2 || 
|-

|- align="center" bgcolor="#CCFFCC" 
|25||W||December 1, 2001||5–2 || align="left"| @ Florida Panthers (2001–02) ||6–15–2–2 || 
|- align="center" bgcolor="#FFBBBB"
|26||L||December 4, 2001||2–3 || align="left"|  Boston Bruins (2001–02) ||6–16–2–2 || 
|- align="center"
|27||T||December 6, 2001||3–3 OT|| align="left"|  Washington Capitals (2001–02) ||6–16–3–2 || 
|- align="center" bgcolor="#FFBBBB"
|28||L||December 8, 2001||3–6 || align="left"| @ Pittsburgh Penguins (2001–02) ||6–17–3–2 || 
|- align="center" bgcolor="#FFBBBB"
|29||L||December 10, 2001||1–3 || align="left"|  Philadelphia Flyers (2001–02) ||6–18–3–2 || 
|- align="center" 
|30||T||December 12, 2001||3–3 OT|| align="left"|  Montreal Canadiens (2001–02) ||6–18–4–2 || 
|- align="center" bgcolor="#FFBBBB"
|31||L||December 14, 2001||1–3 || align="left"|  Chicago Blackhawks (2001–02) ||6–19–4–2 || 
|- align="center" bgcolor="#FFBBBB"
|32||L||December 15, 2001||2–5 || align="left"| @ Washington Capitals (2001–02) ||6–20–4–2 || 
|- align="center" bgcolor="#CCFFCC" 
|33||W||December 18, 2001||3–2 OT|| align="left"| @ Boston Bruins (2001–02) ||7–20–4–2 || 
|- align="center" bgcolor="#FFBBBB"
|34||L||December 19, 2001||2–4 || align="left"|  San Jose Sharks (2001–02) ||7–21–4–2 || 
|- align="center" bgcolor="#FF6F6F"
|35||OTL||December 21, 2001||4–5 OT|| align="left"| @ Carolina Hurricanes (2001–02) ||7–21–4–3 || 
|- align="center" bgcolor="#FFBBBB"
|36||L||December 23, 2001||1–4 || align="left"|  Dallas Stars (2001–02) ||7–22–4–3 || 
|- align="center" 
|37||T||December 26, 2001||3–3 OT|| align="left"|  Florida Panthers (2001–02) ||7–22–5–3 || 
|- align="center" bgcolor="#CCFFCC" 
|38||W||December 28, 2001||5–4 || align="left"|  Toronto Maple Leafs (2001–02) ||8–22–5–3 || 
|- align="center" bgcolor="#FFBBBB"
|39||L||December 31, 2001||3–4 || align="left"| @ Florida Panthers (2001–02) ||8–23–5–3 || 
|-

|- align="center" bgcolor="#FFBBBB"
|40||L||January 2, 2002||1–2 || align="left"| @ Dallas Stars (2001–02) ||8–24–5–3 || 
|- align="center" bgcolor="#FFBBBB"
|41||L||January 3, 2002||1–2 || align="left"| @ Phoenix Coyotes (2001–02) ||8–25–5–3 || 
|- align="center" bgcolor="#FFBBBB"
|42||L||January 6, 2002||2–3 || align="left"|  New York Islanders (2001–02) ||8–26–5–3 || 
|- align="center" bgcolor="#FFBBBB"
|43||L||January 8, 2002||4–7 || align="left"| @ Philadelphia Flyers (2001–02) ||8–27–5–3 || 
|- align="center" bgcolor="#CCFFCC" 
|44||W||January 9, 2002||4–3 OT|| align="left"|  Ottawa Senators (2001–02) ||9–27–5–3 || 
|- align="center" bgcolor="#CCFFCC" 
|45||W||January 11, 2002||1–0 || align="left"|  Calgary Flames (2001–02) ||10–27–5–3 || 
|- align="center" 
|46||T||January 13, 2002||2–2 OT|| align="left"|  Tampa Bay Lightning (2001–02) ||10–27–6–3 || 
|- align="center" bgcolor="#CCFFCC" 
|47||W||January 15, 2002||3–2 || align="left"| @ Toronto Maple Leafs (2001–02) ||11–27–6–3 || 
|- align="center" bgcolor="#FFBBBB"
|48||L||January 17, 2002||3–6 || align="left"| @ Philadelphia Flyers (2001–02) ||11–28–6–3 || 
|- align="center" bgcolor="#CCFFCC" 
|49||W||January 19, 2002||6–1 || align="left"| @ Florida Panthers (2001–02) ||12–28–6–3 || 
|- align="center" bgcolor="#FFBBBB"
|50||L||January 22, 2002||0–3 || align="left"|  Washington Capitals (2001–02) ||12–29–6–3 || 
|- align="center" bgcolor="#CCFFCC" 
|51||W||January 24, 2002||4–2 || align="left"|  New Jersey Devils (2001–02) ||13–29–6–3 || 
|- align="center" bgcolor="#FF6F6F"
|52||OTL||January 26, 2002||2–3 OT|| align="left"| @ Pittsburgh Penguins (2001–02) ||13–29–6–4 || 
|- align="center" bgcolor="#FFBBBB"
|53||L||January 28, 2002||2–4 || align="left"|  Phoenix Coyotes (2001–02) ||13–30–6–4 || 
|- align="center" bgcolor="#FFBBBB"
|54||L||January 30, 2002||0–6 || align="left"|  Toronto Maple Leafs (2001–02) ||13–31–6–4 || 
|-

|- align="center" bgcolor="#CCFFCC" 
|55||W||February 5, 2002||3–2 || align="left"|  Edmonton Oilers (2001–02) ||14–31–6–4 || 
|- align="center" 
|56||T||February 7, 2002||3–3 OT|| align="left"| @ New Jersey Devils (2001–02) ||14–31–7–4 || 
|- align="center" bgcolor="#FFBBBB"
|57||L||February 8, 2002||1–2 || align="left"|  New York Rangers (2001–02) ||14–32–7–4 || 
|- align="center" bgcolor="#FFBBBB"
|58||L||February 11, 2002||4–5 || align="left"| @ Toronto Maple Leafs (2001–02) ||14–33–7–4 || 
|- align="center" bgcolor="#FFBBBB"
|59||L||February 12, 2002||0–3 || align="left"| @ St. Louis Blues (2001–02) ||14–34–7–4 || 
|- align="center" bgcolor="#CCFFCC" 
|60||W||February 26, 2002||2–1 || align="left"|  Buffalo Sabres (2001–02) ||15–34–7–4 || 
|-

|- align="center" bgcolor="#CCFFCC" 
|61||W||March 1, 2002||4–3 || align="left"|  New York Islanders (2001–02) ||16–34–7–4 || 
|- align="center" bgcolor="#FFBBBB"
|62||L||March 2, 2002||1–4 || align="left"| @ New York Islanders (2001–02) ||16–35–7–4 || 
|- align="center" bgcolor="#FFBBBB"
|63||L||March 4, 2002||3–5 || align="left"| @ Montreal Canadiens (2001–02) ||16–36–7–4 || 
|- align="center" bgcolor="#FFBBBB"
|64||L||March 6, 2002||1–4 || align="left"|  Mighty Ducks of Anaheim (2001–02) ||16–37–7–4 || 
|- align="center" bgcolor="#FFBBBB"
|65||L||March 8, 2002||0–3 || align="left"|  Boston Bruins (2001–02) ||16–38–7–4 || 
|- align="center" bgcolor="#FFBBBB"
|66||L||March 10, 2002||1–6 || align="left"| @ New York Islanders (2001–02) ||16–39–7–4 || 
|- align="center" 
|67||T||March 12, 2002||4–4 OT|| align="left"|  Tampa Bay Lightning (2001–02) ||16–39–8–4 || 
|- align="center" bgcolor="#CCFFCC" 
|68||W||March 14, 2002||2–0 || align="left"|  Colorado Avalanche (2001–02) ||17–39–8–4 || 
|- align="center" bgcolor="#FFBBBB"
|69||L||March 16, 2002||2–4 || align="left"|  Vancouver Canucks (2001–02) ||17–40–8–4 || 
|- align="center" bgcolor="#FFBBBB"
|70||L||March 18, 2002||2–4 || align="left"|  Pittsburgh Penguins (2001–02) ||17–41–8–4 || 
|- align="center" bgcolor="#FFBBBB"
|71||L||March 20, 2002||2–4 || align="left"| @ Tampa Bay Lightning (2001–02) ||17–42–8–4 || 
|- align="center" bgcolor="#CCFFCC" 
|72||W||March 22, 2002||5–2 || align="left"| @ New York Rangers (2001–02) ||18–42–8–4 || 
|- align="center" bgcolor="#CCFFCC" 
|73||W||March 23, 2002||3–2 OT|| align="left"| @ Ottawa Senators (2001–02) ||19–42–8–4 || 
|- align="center" bgcolor="#FFBBBB"
|74||L||March 27, 2002||2–4 || align="left"|  Minnesota Wild (2001–02) ||19–43–8–4 || 
|- align="center" bgcolor="#FFBBBB"
|75||L||March 30, 2002||1–4 || align="left"| @ Detroit Red Wings (2001–02) ||19–44–8–4 || 
|-

|- align="center" bgcolor="#FFBBBB"
|76||L||April 2, 2002||2–4 || align="left"| @ Calgary Flames (2001–02) ||19–45–8–4 || 
|- align="center" bgcolor="#FFBBBB"
|77||L||April 3, 2002||0–6 || align="left"| @ Colorado Avalanche (2001–02) ||19–46–8–4 || 
|- align="center" bgcolor="#FFBBBB"
|78||L||April 5, 2002||1–3 || align="left"|  New Jersey Devils (2001–02) ||19–47–8–4 || 
|- align="center" 
|79||T||April 7, 2002||1–1 OT|| align="left"| @ Carolina Hurricanes (2001–02) ||19–47–9–4 || 
|- align="center" 
|80||T||April 10, 2002||4–4 OT|| align="left"|  Florida Panthers (2001–02) ||19–47–10–4 || 
|- align="center" bgcolor="#FF6F6F"
|81||OTL||April 12, 2002||4–5 OT|| align="left"| @ Columbus Blue Jackets (2001–02) ||19–47–10–5 || 
|- align="center" 
|82||T||April 14, 2002||2–2 OT|| align="left"|  Carolina Hurricanes (2001–02) ||19–47–11–5 || 
|-

|-
| Legend:

Player statistics

Scoring
 Position abbreviations: C = Center; D = Defense; G = Goaltender; LW = Left Wing; RW = Right Wing
  = Joined team via a transaction (e.g., trade, waivers, signing) during the season. Stats reflect time with the Thrashers only.
  = Left team via a transaction (e.g., trade, waivers, release) during the season. Stats reflect time with the Thrashers only.

Goaltending
  = Joined team via a transaction (e.g., trade, waivers, signing) during the season. Stats reflect time with the Thrashers only.

Awards and records
Awards
 Calder Memorial Trophy: Dany Heatley
Honors
 Dany Heatley, Forward, NHL All-Rookie Team
 Ilya Kovalchuk, Forward, NHL All-Star

Transactions
The Thrashers were involved in the following transactions from June 10, 2001, the day after the deciding game of the 2001 Stanley Cup Finals, through June 13, 2002, the day of the deciding game of the 2002 Stanley Cup Finals.

Trades

Players acquired

Players lost

Signings

Draft picks
Atlanta's draft picks at the 2001 NHL Entry Draft held at the National Car Rental Center in Sunrise, Florida.

Farm teams
Primary affiliate: Chicago Wolves (AHL)

Secondary affiliate: Greenville Grrrowl (ECHL)

See also
2001-02 NHL season

Notes

References

Atlanta Thrashers seasons
Atlanta Thrashers
Atlanta Thrashers